Azmeri Haque Badhon, popularly known as Badhon, is a Bangladeshi actress who became the 2nd runners-up at the Lux Channel I Superstar in 2006. Later, she made her film debut with a film called Nijhum Oronney in 2010 along with Ilias Kanchan and Champa. She has appeared in a number of TV dramas as well. She gained huge praise from national and international media for her deeply affecting central performance at Rehana Maryam Noor, the first officially selected Bangladeshi film in the “Un Certain Regard” section of the 74th Cannes Film Festival. She wins in the 14th Asia Pacific Screen Awards (APSA) in "Best Actress" category for this film. She also won the Hong Kong Asian Film Festival award in the New Talent category for the same film.

Early life and background
Azmeri Haque Badhon was born in Dhaka, the capital of Bangladesh. Her father was an officer of the Bangladesh Water Development Board.

Education life 
She studied in 7 different schools in different districts including Rajbari, Bhola due to her fathers’ government job. In 2000, she participated in the SSC examination from Monipur School and College in Dhaka. In 2002, from Shaheed Anwar Girls' School she attended higher secondary examination. She got government scholarship in class V and class VIII. In 1997, she studied in the seventh standard. She got admission in Bangladesh Medical College in 2002-03 session. She got 4th rank in first year medical examination. In 2009, she obtained her certificate in medicine. She is a BMDC registered doctor.

Career
Badhon studied at Bangladesh Dental College, Dhaka, and received Bachelor of Dental Surgery from the college. Badhon was deeply passionate about the media industry and eventually took part in a Beauty Pageant at a young age. She is also well known for her work in drama serials such as Choita Pagla, Shuvo Bibaho, Chand ful Omaboshsha, Rong and Hijibiji Nothing. She also has interest in dental practice. Badhon is mostly busy with television plays these days. She will make Bollywood debut with Vishal Bhardwaj’s 'Khufiya' in a prominent role alongside renowned Indian actor Tabu and Ali Fazal.

Personal Life 
In 2018, Azmeri Haque Badhon received guardianship of her only child Mishael Amani Sayera by the verdict was given by Dhaka’s 12th District and Session Court’s Assistant Judge.

Marital crisis and legal battles 
She was married for the first time in 2005-2006 during his second year studies. She wanted to commit suicide in 2005 due to mental crisis and suffered various physical and family abuses. In 2006, she participated in Lux Channel I beauty pageant. During 2010-2014 she lived with Mashroor Siddiqui Sonnet. Badhon's daughter Saira was born on 6 October 2010. In 2014, Mashroor Siddiqui filed a case against Sonnet on charges of extortion, fraud and bad character. Her former husband beats while drunk. In 2017, when daughter Sayera was 6 years old, Bandhan filed a case against torture. Claims custody of daughter. On April 30, 2018, the court ordered the custody of the girl.

Activism

Azmeri Haque Badhon publicly talked about women’s rights and against violence and oppression. She is associated with various social activism. She is playing a vocal role in women's rights, mental health issues. At the Wow Festival organized by the British Council, she made important statements about women's rights and social change. As part of UN Women's social activities, she spoke out against marital rape.

Works

Films

Web series

TV shows and drama
 Mehghey Dhaka Shohor 
 Choita Pagla 
 Shuvo Bibaho  
 Rong 
 Bhalobasha Kare Koy

Awards and nominations

References

External links
 
 

Living people
People from Munshiganj District
Bangladeshi actresses
Bangladeshi television actresses
Bangladeshi film actresses
Bangladeshi female dancers
Bangladeshi dentists
Actresses in Hindi cinema
Bangladeshi expatriate actresses in India
Asia Pacific Screen Award winners
21st-century Bangladeshi actresses
Year of birth missing (living people)